Stawell is a village and civil parish  north-east of Bridgwater, and  north-west of Moorlinch, in the Sedgemoor district of Somerset, England. The civil parish includes the village of Sutton Mallet.

Governance

The parish council has responsibility for local issues, including setting an annual precept (local rate) to cover the council's operating costs and producing annual accounts for public scrutiny. The parish council evaluates local planning applications and works with the local police, district council officers, and neighbourhood watch groups on matters of crime, security, and traffic. The parish council's role also includes initiating projects for the maintenance and repair of parish facilities, as well as consulting with the district council on the maintenance, repair, and improvement of highways, drainage, footpaths, public transport, and street cleaning. Conservation matters (including trees and listed buildings) and environmental issues are also the responsibility of the council.

The village falls within the Non-metropolitan district of Sedgemoor, which was formed on 1 April 1974 under the Local Government Act 1972, having previously been part of Bridgwater Rural District, which is responsible for local planning and building control, local roads, council housing, environmental health, markets and fairs, refuse collection and recycling, cemeteries and crematoria, leisure services, parks, and tourism.

Somerset County Council is responsible for running the largest and most expensive local services such as education, social services, libraries, main roads, public transport, policing and fire services, trading standards, waste disposal and strategic planning.

It is also part of the Bridgwater and West Somerset county constituency represented in the House of Commons of the Parliament of the United Kingdom. It elects one member of parliament by the first past the post system of election.

Religious sites

Church of St Francis, Stawell dates from the 13th century and has been designated by English Heritage as a Grade II* listed building.

Sutton Mallet Church which has a church dating from 1829 on the site of an earlier church. It is Grade II listed. The church is in the care of the Churches Conservation Trust.

The raised stone "Coffin Walk" alongside part of Ford Lane next to the church is thought to be one of only three Coffin Walks left in the country. It is believed to have originally stretched from the old Roman Road above the village, partly following a still existing Public Footpath.

References

External links

Villages in Sedgemoor
Somerset Levels
Civil parishes in Somerset